Midsund is a former municipality in Møre og Romsdal county, Norway.  It was part of the Romsdal region.  The administrative centre was the village of Midsund on Otrøya island. Other settlements on the island included Uglvik and Raknes in the north and Nord-Heggdal in the southeast.

The municipality consisted of many islands. There were also many tiny uninhabited islands and skerries. The islands all sit at the mouth of the great Romsdalsfjord.

At the time if its dissolution in 2020, the  municipality is the 384th largest by area out of the 422 municipalities in Norway. Midsund is the 323rd most populous municipality in Norway with a population of 2,049.

General information

The municipality of Midsund was established on 1 January 1965 when the old municipality of Sør-Aukra (population: 1,912) was merged with part of Midøya island and the neighboring island of Dryna (population: 334) which were part of the old Vatne Municipality.

On 1 January 2020, the municipality of Midsund was merged into the neighboring Molde Municipality, along with the municipality of Nesset. Together, the new Molde Municipality is significantly larger.

Name
The municipality is named after the strait that flows between the islands of Otrøya and Midøya, the Midsundet. The first element of the name Miðja means "middle" and the second element sund means "strait" or "sound".

Coat of arms
The coat of arms was granted on 15 May 1987. The arms show two silver triangles on a blue background, representing Otrøya and Midøya islands in the ocean. These two main islands in the municipality are separated by a small strait, the Midsund. The geographical situation is symbolised in the arms.

Churches
The Church of Norway had one parish within the municipality of Midsund. It is part of the Molde domprosti (arch-deanery) in the Diocese of Møre.

Geography

To the north are many smaller islands including Gossa (in Aukra Municipality) and Harøya, Sandøya, and Orta (in Sandøy Municipality). To the west lie the islands of Fjørtofta, Skuløya, and Haramsøya (in Haram Municipality).

The three largest islands of the community lie in a line from ENE to WSW (Otrøya, Midøya, and Dryna). The island of Magerøya lies between Midøya and Otrøya and a bridge connects it to the latter. Tautra lies in the Moldefjorden, southeast of Otrøya. At Oppstad, the cliff is feared to collapse, which would cause a small tsunami in the Moldefjorden.

On the southern coast of Otrøya the following small villages can be found: (from east to west) Solholmen, Nord-Heggdal, Oppstad, Sør-Heggdal, and Klauset. The north has the following villages: (east to west) Ræstad, Rakvåg, Tangen, Raknes, and Uglvik. On the western side of Otrøya, facing the bay that separates it from Midøya, lies the village of Midsund, the largest settlement in the community. The Midsund Bridge connects it with Midøya. Dryna and Midøya are also connected with a bridge. Ferries run between the islands and the mainland.  There is a ferry from Solholmen across the Julsundet to Molde Municipality and from the island of Dryna to the village of Brattvåg (in Haram Municipality). The larger three islands' interior is wilderness, but the rims are used for keeping cattle and small farming.

Government
All municipalities in Norway, including Midsund, are responsible for primary education (through 10th grade), outpatient health services, senior citizen services, unemployment and other social services, zoning, economic development, and municipal roads.  The municipality is governed by a municipal council of elected representatives, which in turn elect a mayor.  The municipality falls under the Romsdal District Court and the Frostating Court of Appeal.

Municipal council
The municipal council of Midsund is made up of 17 representatives that are elected to four year terms. The party breakdown for the final municipal council was as follows:

Demographics
The municipality had 1,939 inhabitants (January 2005), with 50.3% male.  The percentage of people older than 67 is 18.3%. Unemployment is 2.3%. Population growth is stable. Most inhabitants are fishers or small farmers.

Media
The newspaper Øyavis was published in Midsund from 1983 to 2016.

See also
List of former municipalities of Norway

References

External links
Municipal fact sheet from Statistics Norway 

 
Molde
Former municipalities of Norway
1965 establishments in Norway
2020 disestablishments in Norway
Populated places disestablished in 2020